Railcars is an American, San Francisco-based shitgaze project of Aria C Jalali. For the project's initial release, Jalali teamed up with Xiu Xiu front man Jamie Stewart to produce his follow up EP "Cities vs Submarines" in 2008 (released on Gold Robot Records). Jalali has said he will not be teaming with Stewart again to produce his next album, Cathedral With No Eyes," due to logistical reasons, namely Stewart's move to North Carolina. Railcars' music is described as having "pastel-coloured vocals suitably warped, but with a low-cut frenetic backdrop surrounding them."

 Releases 
2011: Hounds of Love (Kate Bush cover album) (Crash Symbols, Amdiscs)
2011: "Said Sister" 7" Vinyl (Gold Robot Records)
2010: remixes (digital, s/r)
2009: Cathedral With No Eyes 12" Vinyl (Stumparumper)
2009: Live @ Fleche d'Or, Paris'' Cassette (Room Tapes)
2008: "Cities vs. Submarines" 7" Vinyl (Gold Robot Records)

References

External links 
 Railcars on Myspace

Indie rock musical groups from California
Musical groups from San Francisco